Schüttorf is a Samtgemeinde ("collective municipality") in the district of the County of Bentheim, in Lower Saxony, Germany. Its seat is in the municipality Schüttorf.

Municipalities

 Engden 
 Isterberg 
 Ohne 
 Quendorf 
 Samern 
 Schüttorf

Samtgemeinden in Lower Saxony